Joe Daley may refer to:
Joe Daley (ice hockey) (born 1943), ice hockey goaltender
Joe Daley (golfer) (born 1960), American golfer
Joe Daley (musician) (1918–1994), American jazz tenor saxophonist, composer, and music teacher

See also
Joseph Daley (disambiguation)
Joe Daly (disambiguation)
Joe Dale (1921–2000), English footballer